Perambalur is a Lok Sabha constituency in Tamil Nadu. Its Tamil Nadu Parliamentary Constituency number is 25 of 39.

Assembly segments
After 2009,Perambalur Lok Sabha constituency is composed of the following assembly segments 

Before 2009,Perambalur Lok Sabha constituency is composed of the following assembly segments:
Uppiliapuram (ST)
Perambalur (SC)
Varahur (SC)
Ariyalur
Andimadam
Jayankondam

Members of the Parliament

Election results

General Election 2019

General Election 2014

General Election 2009

General Election 2004

See also
 Perambalur
 List of Constituencies of the Lok Sabha

References

 Election Commission of India

External links
Perambalur lok sabha  constituency election 2019 date and schedule

Lok Sabha constituencies in Tamil Nadu